Lloyd Vincent "Vic" Hackley is an educational administrator in North Carolina who was named in July 2007 as the interim chancellor of Fayetteville State University.  He was previously chancellor of FSU from 1988 to 1994.

Hackley is an alumnus of Lucy Addison High School in Roanoke, Virginia.  He served in the United States Air Force during the Vietnam War. He has a bachelor's degree from Michigan State University and a Ph.D. in International Relations from the University of North Carolina at Chapel Hill.

Hackley taught political science at the United States Air Force Academy before becoming a university administrator.  He was the vice president for academic affairs at the University of North Carolina from 1978 to 1981.  In this position he was over academic affairs at all campuses of the University of North Carolina.  He next was the chancellor of the University of Arkansas at Pine Bluff from 1981 to 1985, and then vice president for student services at the University of North Carolina for three years before starting his first term as chancellor of FSU.

Hackley, a retired U.S. Air Force officer, was president of the North Carolina Community College System from 1995 through 1997 and interim chancellor of North Carolina A&T State University in 2006 and 2007.

Early in 2007 an audit was released at North Carolina A&T that indicated that prior to Hackley taking office there the university had $500,000 in misappropriated federal grants.

In 2007, he replaced Chancellor T. J. Bryan at FSU.

References

UNC System Press release
News & Observer blog
Pope Center report on Hackley's appointment at FSU
annou8ncement of Hackley's appointment as interim chancellor of North Carolina A&T

Living people
Fayetteville State University
North Carolina A&T State University leaders
University of North Carolina administrators
Michigan State University alumni
University of North Carolina at Chapel Hill alumni
United States Air Force Academy faculty
University of Arkansas at Pine Bluff people
North Carolina Community College System
United States Air Force officers
Year of birth missing (living people)